Tyshawn Jones (born December 24, 1998) is a regular-footed American skateboarder, winner of the 2018 and 2022 Thrasher Skater of the Year award.

Early life
Born in Manhattan, New York Jones grew up splitting his childhood between New Jersey and The Bronx, New York.  After playing Skate with his brother and uncle at the age of 10, Jones was introduced to the world of skateboarding and purchased his first skateboard from Target. Although Jones' older brother (Brian Jones) eventually quit skateboarding, Tyshawn remained persistent without letting failures discourage him. After moving back to the Bronx from New Jersey Jones focused on skating more due to a lack of friends. Encountering skaters that were better gave Jones a competitive drive which pushed Jones to become better.  Jones was a fan of Lizard King in his early days and part of a photo op featuring Lizard King followed by "thousands" of other skaters. Jones watched skate footage growing up:"I used to go home from school and watch Andrew Reynolds’ Baker 3 part. I would just rewind his frontside flip over the Hollywood 16 rail over and over and over. Brian Herman, Antwuan Dixon… I’ve never even seen (Baker 3) all the way through, I’d just watch the parts."

Professional skateboarding career
After being exposed to the idea of sponsorship Jones worked on getting clips of himself skating in New York City, he saw this as an opportunity to cut cost of skateboarding equipment and wasn't so concerned about exposure. Initially Jones was under a flow sponsorship for Toy Machine. Jones first met Jason Dill (founder and CEO of Fucking Awesome) in 2011 in New York City. Dill was impressed by Jones' skating ability which evolved into Jones getting sponsored and going pro under Fucking Awesome. Jones' ability and style caught the eye of Supreme, which lead him to appear in several clips for the brand and eventually the store's 2014 video, cherry by Bill Strobeck. Jones' passion and post-trick-hype punctuated his unique style. Following the cherry video, Jones co-founded his own hardware/apparel company, Hardies, with teammate Na-Kel Smith. Also in 2014, Jones signed with Adidas. He made his debut solo skate video part on Adidas' full-length team video, Away Days. Jones' first signature colorway/material with Adidas came out in 2017. 

In 2022, Jones left Fucking Awesome to start his own company, King Skateboards.

Thrasher Skater of the Year
In 2018, at the age of 19, Jones released one of the "most talk about parts of the year" in Supreme's video "BLESSED". Jones' part opens with a switch flip into the fountain at Washington Square Park and earned him a 2018 Skater of the Year award from Thrasher magazine, awarded to him by then editor-in-chief Jake Phelps. He is on the cover of the January 2019 issue. In 2022, Tyshawn again won Thrasher's skater of the year award.

Sponsors 
As of December 2022, Jones' sponsors are King Skateboards, Adidas, Supreme, Hardies Hardware, Thunder Trucks, Spitfire, and New Era.

Music video appearances 
In May 2022, Tyshawn appears in the Kendrick Lamar music video for the song N95 featuring Baby Keem, skateboarding around the streets of New York City.

References

1998 births
Living people
21st-century American businesspeople
African-American businesspeople
African-American skateboarders
Sportspeople from the Bronx
21st-century African-American sportspeople